Şıpşıyıq is a rural locality (a derevnya) in Biektaw District, Tatarstan. The population was 2 as of 2010.

Geography 
Şıpşıyıq is located 30 km north of Biektaw, district's administrative centre, and 54 km north of Qazan, republic's capital, by road.

History 
The earliest known record of the settlement dates from 1650.

From 18th to the first half of the 19th centuries village's residents belonged to the social estate of state peasants.

By the beginning of the twentieth century, village had a mosque, a mekteb and a small shop.

Before the creation of the Tatar ASSR in 1920 was a part of Qazan Uyezd of Qazan Governorate. Since 1920 was a part of Arça Canton; after the creation of districts in Tatar ASSR (Tatarstan) in Döbyaz (1930–1963),  Yäşel Üzän (1963–1965) and Biektaw districts.

References

External links 
 

Rural localities in Vysokogorsky District